Thomas Bullock, D.D. (24 March 1694, in Herefordshire – 30 May 1760, in Norwich) was an Anglican Dean in the eighteenth century.

Bullock was educated at Christ Church, Oxford. He held livings at Mitcham, Surrey; Thurne and North Creake. He was Chaplain to the Bishop of Norwich from 1727 to 1738; and Dean of Norwich from 2 August 1739 until his death.

Notes

1694 births
People from Herefordshire
Alumni of Christ Church, Oxford
18th-century English Anglican priests
Deans of Norwich
1760 deaths